Tritia unifasciata is a species of sea snail, a marine gastropod mollusk in the family Nassariidae, the Nassa mud snails or dog whelks.

Description
The shell grows to a length of 12 mm.

The ovate, conical shell is elongated and polished. The spire is composed of seven pretty distinct, but slightly convex whorls, ornamented with numerous deeply furrowed folds. The folds of the body whorl are gradually effaced by age, and sometimes completely disappear. These folds are crossed by very fine and very numerous transverse striae, colored with articulated, elongated, brown and whitish spots. The striae of the base are more strongly prominent. The whitish aperture is ovate. The outer lip is thick and denticulated internally. The white columella is arcuated, with a few guttules at its base. The general color is of a yellowish white, or fawn-color, with a brown, decurrent band above the suture, and a single other at the middle of the body whorl like a girdle.

Distribution
This species occurs in the Western Mediterranean Sea.

References

 Moreno D. & Templado J., 1995: El complejo de especies "Nassarius cuvierii - N. unifasciatus" (Gastropoda, Nassariidae) en el SE de España, Iberus 12(2): 33-47
 Gofas, S.; Le Renard, J.; Bouchet, P. (2001). Mollusca, in: Costello, M.J. et al. (Ed.) (2001). European register of marine species: a check-list of the marine species in Europe and a bibliography of guides to their identification. Collection Patrimoines Naturels, 50: pp. 180–213

External links
 
 Galindo, L. A.; Puillandre, N.; Utge, J.; Lozouet, P.; Bouchet, P. (2016). The phylogeny and systematics of the Nassariidae revisited (Gastropoda, Buccinoidea). Molecular Phylogenetics and Evolution. 99: 337-353

unifasciata
Gastropods described in 1834